Dragonland is a power metal band from Sweden. The group is known for their self-produced The Dragonland Chronicles fantasy saga covering their first, second, and fifth albums, and for the original symphonic/electronic parts by Elias Holmlid.

History 
The band was founded in 1999 by guitarist Nicklas Magnusson and Jonas Heidgert. Soon after Daniel Kvist, Magnus Olin and Christer Pederson joined in. Their first demo was recorded in January 2000. Only three months before the recording of their debut album started, The Battle of the Ivory Plains, Kvist decided to leave the band and was soon replaced by Olof Mörck. The album was released on 30 April 2001, and the second album, Holy War, was released on 8 February 2002. Both featured singer Jonas Heidgert on drums.

Their third album, Starfall, was released on 27 October 2004, featuring Jesse Lindskog on drums. Tom S. Englund and Henrik Danhage (of Evergrey) and Johanna Andersson provided guest performances on the album, including vocals and guitar solos.

Their fourth album, Astronomy, was released on 11 November 2006. Nightrage's Marios Iliopoulos, Amaranthe's Elize Ryd, Cyhra's Jake E and Dead by April's Jimmie Strimell provided guest appearances on this album.

Work on a fifth Dragonland album was announced via Blabbermouth on 27 April 2008. In September 2009, Dragonland launched their re-designed Myspace site, together with a high-quality preproduction of "The Shadow of The Mithril Mountains", a song from the fifth album. It took some time before the album was completely ready. Five years after Astronomy the band finally released the fifth album, Under the Grey Banner, on 11 November 2011. Where Starfall and Astronomy are two separate albums, Under the Grey Banner continues the story of their first two albums.

On 25 October 2014 it was announced that they would release a reissue of the first album, The Battle of the Ivory Plains, and a remastered version of the second album, Holy War. Both albums have brand new cover artwork, and they were released on 5 December 2014. In the first album, there is also a newly recorded song, "A New Dawn", as its bonus track.

They have worked on their upcoming sixth album The Power of the Nightstar, their first album in over a decade and, similarly to Starfall and Astronomy, separate from the Dragonland Chronicles saga, though following a different sci-fi storyline. The band have released the title track for the album as its first single and the band's first ever music video on 3 June 2022. The album's second single "Flight from Destruction" was released on 29 July 2022, and the album was released on 14 October 2022.

Discography 
Studio albums
The Battle of the Ivory Plains (2001)
Holy War (2002)
Starfall (2004)
Astronomy (2006)
Under the Grey Banner (2011)
The Power of the Nightstar (2022)

Demos
Storming Across Heaven (2000)

Band members 
Current line-up
 Jonas Heidgert – vocals (1999–present), drums (1999–2002)
 Olof Mörck – lead guitar (2000–present), keyboard, synthesizer, piano (1999–2000)
 Jesse Lindskog – lead guitar (2009–present), drums (2002–2009)
 Elias Holmlid – keyboard, synthesizer, piano (2000–present)
 Johan Nunez – drums (2014–present)
 Anders Hammer – bass (2007–present)
Former members
 Daniel Kvist – lead guitar (1999–2000)
 Magnus Olin – drums (1999)
 Robert Willstedt – drums (2002–2003)
 Morten Löwe Sörensen – drums (2011–2014)
 Christer Pederson – bass (1999–2007)
 Nicklas Magnusson – rhythm guitar (1999–2011)

Timeline

References

External links 
 Dragonland's MySpace profile
 Century Media's Dragonland page
 King Record's Dragonland page (Japanese)

Musical groups established in 1999
Swedish power metal musical groups
Swedish symphonic metal musical groups
Century Media Records artists
1999 establishments in Sweden